Debo Powers is an American politician and former educator who served as a member of Montana House of Representatives for District 3 from 2019 to 2021.

Early life and education
Powers was born in Philadelphia, Pennsylvania and attended Florida State University.

Career 
Powers was a public school teacher. Powers was a school principal from 1998 to 2011.

In October 2019, Powers was appointed to represent District 3 in the Montana House of Representatives, after former Representative Zac Perry resigned to attend graduate school. Powers assumed office on November 5, 2019. Powers never served a day in the Montana Legislature.

Powers ran for election to a full term in 2020. She was unopposed in the Democratic primary, but lost to Republican Braxton Mitchell in the general election by 20 points.

Personal life 
Powers lives in Polebridge, Montana.

See also 
 Montana House of Representatives, District 3

References

External links 
 Debo Powers at demcastusa.com

American women educators
Living people
Florida State University alumni
Year of birth missing (living people)
People from Philadelphia
Democratic Party members of the Montana House of Representatives